League table for teams participating in Ykkönen, the second tier of the Finnish Soccer League system, in 1991.

League table

Elo Kuopio withdrew

Promotion/relegation playoff

OTP Oulu - FinnPa Helsinki  3-2
FinnPa Helsinki - OTP Oulu  1-3

OTP Oulu remained in Premier Division.

See also
Veikkausliiga (Tier 1)

References

Ykkönen seasons
2
Finland
Finland